A shipwright is a person in the trade of yacht and/or shipbuilding. Shipwright may also refer to:

Shipwright (annual) 
Denis Shipwright (1898–1984), British Royal Air Force officer

See also 

The Shipwright's Company, livery company a.k.a. Worshipful Company of Shipwrights
Shipwright's Arms Hotel, Australian former pub